Sergio Domínguez may refer to:

Sergio Domínguez Muñoz (born 1986), Spanish cyclist
Sergio Domínguez Rodríguez (born 1979), Spanish cyclist